The 1941 Maryland Terrapins football team represented the University of Maryland in the 1941 college football season. In their third season under head coach Jack Faber, the Terrapins compiled a 3–5–1 record (1–2 in conference), finished in 12th place in the Southern Conference, and outscored their opponents 196 to 49.  The team played its home games at Old Byrd Stadium in College Park, Maryland (three games), and at Baltimore Stadium in Baltimore (three games).

Schedule

References

Maryland
Maryland Terrapins football seasons
Maryland Terrapins football